111 is the third studio album by Brazilian singer and drag queen Pabllo Vittar, released on March 26, 2020, by Sony Music Brasil. 111 is a trilingual album, containing Spanish, English and Brazilian Portuguese lyrics. The album is the second part proceeding the EP, titled  (2019). The album includes collaborations with Charli XCX, Ivete Sangalo, Thalía, Psirico and Jerry Smith.

Track listing

Certifications

References

2020 albums
Pabllo Vittar albums
Sony Music Brazil albums
Sequel albums